The 1980 Asian Junior Women's Volleyball Championship was held in Seoul, South Korea from 19 October to 27 October 1980

Results

|}

|}

Final standing

References
Results (Archived 2014-10-15)

A
V
Asian women's volleyball championships
International volleyball competitions hosted by South Korea
Asian Junior